Bushwhacking was a form of guerrilla warfare during the American Revolutionary War, War of 1812, and American Civil War.

Bushwhacker(s), Bushwacker(s), or Bushwhacking may also refer to:

 Bushwacker (bull), #13/6, hall of fame bucking bull
 Bushwacker (cocktail), a rum and coffee-liqueur
 Bushwacker (comics), a comic book character
 Bushwacker (dragster), a race car
 Buschwhacker, a NASCAR racing term
 Bushwackers Drum and Bugle Corps, a drum and bugle corps in Princeton, New Jersey
 The Bushwhackers (band), Australian folk band in the 1950s
 The Bushwackers (band), Australian folk and country band founded in 1971
 The Bushwhackers (film), a 1925 Australian silent film
 The Bushwackers (film), a 1952 Western
 The Bushwhackers, a professional wrestling team from New Zealand
 Freehiking, or bushwhacking, off-trail hiking

See also
 Bushwhacked (disambiguation)